Jack shit may refer to:

 Nothing
 Jack Shit, the stagename of Chris Jacobson, bassist of the band Mentors
 Jack Shit!, a 2011 art exhibition of works by Gavin Turk
 Jack Shit, a card hand in Euchre variations
 Jackshit, a country music band composed of Val McCallum, Davey Faragher and Pete Thomas